National Taipei University (NTPU), founded in 1949, is a national university in Taiwan which specializes in law, business, humanities, and social sciences. Before 2000, the university was named the College of Law and Business, National Chung Hsing University. The university's main campus is in Sanxia District, New Taipei, Taiwan. Two other campus and education center are in Zhongshan District, Taipei, Taiwan. According to Times Higher Education World University Ranking, it's ranked 1501+ in the world, and 30th in Taiwan.

History and development
NTPU has undergone different stages of development. It began as the Taiwan Provincial College of Law and Business in 1949; it merged with and became the local Junior College of Administration and the specifically established Administrative Junior College. In 1961, it combined with the newly established College of Science and Engineering to become Taiwan Provincial Chung Hsing University. In 1964, the Evening School was set up on the Taipei Campus. In 1968 another Evening School and the College of Liberal Arts were added to the Taichung Campus. The university continued to grow in size, and in 1971 it became National Chung Hsing University. In February 2000, the Taipei Campus including the College of Law and Business and Taipei Evening School became National Taipei University.

So far, NTPU has signed MOUs and/or agreements with more than 110 universities worldwide to form partnerships. These partnerships are manifested through all kinds of programs for students and academic faculties, including international joint research, exchange scholars, visiting scholars, dual degrees, exchange programs, and internships.

NTPU and Fu Jen Catholic University are the representative university of New Taipei City by QS Most Affordable Cities for Students Ranking. In addition, NTPU has exchange and visiting students from America, India, Singapore, Hong Kong, China, France, Poland and other European countries.

Campus
National Taipei University have Sansia (Main) Campus and Taipei Campus.

Organization

The president heads the university, while each college is headed by a dean and each department by a chairman:

College of Law
Department of Law
Graduate School of Law
The Center of Comparative Law Documentation
College of Business
Department of Business Administration
Department of Banking & Cooperative Management
Department of Accountancy
Department of Statistics
Department of Recreational Sport Management
Graduate Institute of Information Management
Electronic Business Research Center (EBRC)
Center for Cooperative Economics & Non-Profit Organizations (CCENB)
EMBA in International Finance
Graduate Institute of International Business
College of Public Affairs
Department of Public Administration and Policy
Department of Real Estate and Built Environment
Department of Public Finance
Graduate Institute of Urban Planning
Graduate Institute of Natural Resource Management
Research Center for Public Opinion and Election Studies
Center for Land Management and Technology
College of Social Sciences:
Department of Economics
Department of Sociology
Department of Social Work
Graduate School of Criminology
Research Center for Taiwan Development
College of Humanities
Department of Chinese Languages and Literature
Department of Foreign Languages and Applied Linguistics
Department of History
Graduate Institute of Folk Arts
Graduate Institute of Classical Texts
Center for International Negotiations and Interpretations (CINI)
College of Electrical Engineering and Computer Science
Department of Computer Science and Information Engineering
Department of Communication Engineering
Department of Electrical Engineering

Ranking

Notable alumni
 Chang Chiu-hua, Magistrate of Miaoli County (1989-1993)
 Huang Hsin-chieh (Class of 1951) - Politician, 3rd Chairperson of the Democratic Progressive Party (DPP), Publisher of the Formosa magazine (美麗島雜誌()) and (台灣政論()) Taiwan Political Theory magazine, Democracy Activist, and Spiritual leader of Taiwan Democracy.
 Perng Fai-nan - Governor of Central Bank of the Republic of China (1998-2018)
 Tseng Ming-chung - Chairperson of Financial Supervisory Commission (2013-2016)
 Amber Kuo - Singer and actress
 Janine Chang - Actress
 Freddy Lin - Captain of New Power Party (2015)
 Chiang Pin-kung - Vice President of Legislative Yuan (2002-2005)
 Lai Pin-yu - cosplayer, member of Legislative Yuan
 Lin Fong-cheng - Vice Chairman of Kuomintang (2007-2014)
 Lin Shu-fen - Member of Legislative Yuan
 Wang Ginn-wang - Minister of Coast Guard Administration (2006-2014)
 Wong Chin-chu - Minister of Cultural Affairs (2007-2008), Magistrate of Changhua County (2001-2005)
 Wu Chen-huan - Political Deputy Minister of Justice (2012-2015)
 Yu Shyi-kun - Premier of the Republic of China (2002-2005)

See also

List of universities in Taiwan

References

External links 

 NTPU official website 

 
Educational institutions established in 1949
1949 establishments in Taiwan
Educational institutions established in 2000
2000 establishments in Taiwan
Universities and colleges in Taiwan
Universities and colleges in Taipei
Comprehensive universities in Taiwan